The Silver Medal of the Zoological Society of London is "Awarded to a Fellow of the Society or any other person for contributions to the understanding and appreciation of zoology, including such activities as public education in natural history, and wildlife conservation."
It was first awarded in 1847.

Winners (pre-1964)

Winners (post-1964)

In 1964, the criteria for the Silver Medal were changed, split into 2 categories. Category 1 is awarded to individuals for Curation or distinguished service to the Society, whilst Category 2 is awarded to fellows who have provided a significant contribution to the field of zoology, including in both wildlife conservation and public education of natural history.

References

British science and technology awards
Zoology
Awards established in 1847
1847 establishments in the United Kingdom
Zoological Society of London